1992 Sanfrecce Hiroshima season

Team name
Club nameSanfrecce Hiroshima Football Club
NicknameSanfrecce

Review and events

Competitions

Domestic results

Emperor's Cup

J.League Cup

Player statistics

 † player(s) joined the team after the opening of this season.

Transfers

In:

Out:

Mazda SC Toyo is second team of Mazda SC (Sanfrecce Hiroshima).

Transfers during the season

In
Hiroshi Matsuda (from Sanfrecce Hiroshima Coach)
Kazuyori Mochizuki (from Sanfrecce Hiroshima Coach)

Out
none

References

Other pages
 J. League official site
 Sanfrecce Hiroshima official site

Sanfrecce Hiroshima
Sanfrecce Hiroshima seasons